The Centre for Byzantine Studies or Centre for Byzantine Research is an organization based in Thessaloniki, Greece.

It was founded in 1966 on the initiative of a group of professors from the Faculty of Letters of the Aristotle University of Thessaloniki. The centre is a research organization which promotes the study of Byzantine history, culture and civilization.

It is housed in Villa Melissa (the old orphanage Melissa) on Vasilissis Olgas Avenue.

References

External links
Official website

1966 establishments in Greece
Buildings and structures in Thessaloniki
Aristotle University of Thessaloniki
Byzantine studies
Research institutes established in 1966
Book publishing companies of Greece
Historical societies